Ivan Grigoryevich Bolshakov (October 10, 1902 – March 19, 1980) was a Soviet statesman, organizer of film production, Chairman of the Committee for Cinematography Under the Council of People's Commissars of the Soviet Union, Minister of Cinematography of the Soviet Union (1939–1953).

Biography
Born into a bourgeois family. From 1916 to 1922, he worked as a machine operator, and then as a timekeeper at the Tula Arms Factory. In 1918, he joined the Russian Communist Party (Bolsheviks).

In 1928, he graduated from the Moscow Institute of People's Economy Named After Georgy Plekhanov, and in 1931 – the Economic Department of the Institute of Red Professors.

From 1924 to 1927, he worked as an instructor at the regional committee of metal workers' trade unions, Moscow. From 1927 to 1928, he was the Executive Secretary of the Central Bureau of the Proletarian Students of the All–Union Central Council of Trade Unions.

From 1931 to 1937, he worked as a consultant in the Office of Affairs of the Council of People's Commissars of the Soviet Union, from 1937 to 1938 – Deputy Administrator of the Council of People's Commissars of the Soviet Union, from December 1938 to June 1939 – as Administrator of the Council of People's Commissars of the Soviet Union. Deputy of the Supreme Council of the Russian Soviet Federative Socialist Republic of the 1st Convocation.

Since June 1939 – Chairman of the Committee for Cinematography Under the Council of People's Commissars of the Soviet Union, since March 1946 – Minister of Cinematography of the Soviet Union.

From 1953 to 1954, he worked as First Deputy Minister of Culture of the Soviet Union.

From 1954 to 1959 – Deputy Minister of Foreign Trade of the Soviet Union.

From 1960 to 1963 – Deputy Chairman of the State Committee of the Council of Ministers of the Soviet Union for Cultural Relations with Foreign Countries.

Buried at the Novodevichy Cemetery.

Awards
Two Orders of Lenin (April 14, 1944; March 6, 1966)
Order of the Red Banner of Labour
Two Orders of the Badge of Honour

Image in the cinema
The Inner Circle (1991) – Alexander Feklistov

Bibliography
Handbook of Student Trade Union Worker / Compiled by Ivan Bolshakov and Alexander Samarin; All–Union Central Bureau of Proletarian Students of the All–Union Central Council of Trade Unions – Moscow: Publishing House of the All–Union Central Council of Trade Unions, 1928 (Printing House of the Editorial and Publishing Department of the All–Union Central Council of Trade Unions) – 319 Pages
25 Years of Soviet Cinema: A Shorthand for a Public Lecture by the Chairman of the Committee for Cinematography Under the Council of People's Commissars of the Soviet Union, Comrade Ivan Bolshakov, Read on October 27, 1944, in the Great Hall of the Conservatory in Moscow / Lecture Bureau Under the Committee for Higher Education Under the Council of People's Commissars of the Soviet Union – Moscow: Printing House of the Newspaper "Pravda", 1944 – 29 Pages
25 Years of Soviet Cinema / Ivan Bolshakov; Translated by the Publishing House of G. Mikhailov, Vl. Khristoskov – Sofia: Bulgarian Business, 1945 – 53 Pages
Five–Year Plan for the Restoration and Development of Soviet Cinematography: Revised Transcript of a Report at the Moscow House of Cinema on April 24, 1946 / Ivan Bolshakov, Minister of Cinematography of the Soviet Union – Moscow: State Publishing House of Cinematic Literature, 1946 (Printing House "Red Printer") – 24 Pages
Five–Year Plan for the Restoration and Development of Soviet Cinematography / Ivan Bolshakov, Minister of Cinematography of the Soviet Union – 2nd Edition (Revised) – Moscow: State Publishing House of Cinematic Literature, 1946 (Printing House "Red Banner") – 47 Pages
Soviet Cinema in 1947: Transcript of a Public Lecture Delivered on March 24, 1948, in the Large Auditorium of the Polytechnic Museum in Moscow / Ivan Bolshakov, Minister of Cinematography of the Soviet Union – Moscow: State Publishing House of Cinematic Literature, 1948 (Printing House of the State Publishing House of Cultural and Educational Literature) – 42 Pages
Soviet Cinema During the Great Patriotic War (1941–1945) / Ivan Bolshakov – Moscow: State Publishing House of Cinematic Literature, 1948 (Printing House "Red Printer") – 148 Pages
Soviet Cinema During the Great Patriotic War: 1941–1945 / Ivan Bolshakov – 2nd Edition – Moscow: State Publishing House of Cinematic Literature, 1950 (20th Printing House of the Union Trust of the Printing Industry) – 216 Pages
Soviet Cinema (Main Stages of Development): Materials for Reports / Union of Bulgarian–Soviet Societies – Sofia, 1950 – 24 Pages
Soviet Cinema in the Post–War Period: Material for the Lecture / Ivan Bolshakov; All–Union Society for the Dissemination of Political and Scientific Knowledge – Moscow, 1952 – 14 Sheets
Soviet Cinema in the Post–War Years – Moscow: Knowledge, 1952 – 39 Pages
Soviet Union at the World Exhibition in Brussels – Moscow: Knowledge, 1958 – 32 Pages
World Review: the Success of the Soviet Union at the World Exhibition in Brussels – Moscow: Izvestia, 1959 – 87 Pages
New York, "Colosseum": Notes on the Soviet Exhibition in New York – Moscow: Izvestia, 1959 – 40 Pages
In the Face of the Whole World – Moscow: Foreign Trade Publishing House, 1960 – 130 Pages
On All Continents of the World – Moscow: Publishing House of the Institute of International Relations, 1963 – 150 Pages
Technical Aesthetics and Social Environment / Ivan Bolshakov, Candidate of Art History – Moscow, 1966 – 30 Pages
Thematic Plan of Lectures on Technical Aesthetics: (Methodological Manual) – Moscow: Knowledge, 1967 – 17 Pages
Thematic Plan of Lectures on Technical Aesthetics: Methodological Manual / All–Union Society "Knowledge". All–Union Scientific Research Institute of Technical Aesthetics – Moscow: Knowledge, 1968 – 14 Pages
Harmony of the Objective World – Moscow, 1968 – 30 Pages
Subject World of the Future / Ivan Bolshakov, Candidate of Art History – Moscow, 1971 – 46 Pages
Methodological Advice for Lecturers on the Promotion of Technical Aesthetics / Ivan Bolshakov, Candidate of Art History – Moscow: Knowledge, 1972 – 15 Pages

References

1902 births
1980 deaths
People from Tula Governorate
Bolsheviks
People's commissars and ministers of the Soviet Union
First convocation members of the Supreme Soviet of the Soviet Union
Members of the Supreme Soviet of the Russian Soviet Federative Socialist Republic, 1938–1947
Institute of Red Professors alumni
Recipients of the Order of Lenin
Recipients of the Order of the Red Banner of Labour
Burials at Novodevichy Cemetery